Booker T. Washington School was a black school in Ashland, Kentucky. It was named after Booker T. Washington (1856–1915), the American civil rights leader, educator and author. The school taught black children grades 1 through 12.

The brick schoolhouse stood at the corner Seventh Street and Central Avenue. The school closed in 1962. The building has since been razed. A state historical plaque marks the location.

References

Historically segregated African-American schools in Kentucky
Schools in Boyd County, Kentucky
Ashland, Kentucky
Demolished buildings and structures in Kentucky
1962 disestablishments in Kentucky